Anzac Parade is a major road in the south-eastern suburbs of Sydney, Australia. It included part of the marathon during the 2000 Summer Olympics, and the blue line denoting the marathon's path still exists today.

Route
Anzac Parade starts at Driver's Triangle, a small park at the intersection of Moore Park Road and South Dowling Street at Moore Park. It is a southward extension of Flinders Street, on the border of Surry Hills and Paddington. At this intersection there is also an entrance to the Eastern Distributor. The street received its name in memory of members of the First Australian Imperial Force (later to become known as Anzacs) who marched down the street from their barracks (now a heritage listed part of the University of New South Wales) to Sydney Harbour, where they were transported to Europe during World War I.

Anzac Parade passes south through the suburbs of Moore Park, Kensington, Kingsford, Maroubra, Matraville, Malabar, Chifley and Little Bay before ending at a loop at La Perouse.

Major landmarks along Anzac Parade include the University of New South Wales (UNSW) and the National Institute of Dramatic Art (known as NIDA).

History
The passing of the Main Roads Act of 1924 through the Parliament of New South Wales provided for the declaration of Main Roads, roads partially funded by the State government through the Main Roads Board (later the Department of Main Roads, and eventually Transport for NSW). Main Road No. 171 was declared along this road on 8 August 1928, from the intersection with Allison Road in Kensington, via Kingsford and Maroubra to La Perouse.

The route was allocated State Route 70 in 1974, but was completely decommissioned in 2004.

In February 2015, the Albert Cotter Bridge across Anzac Parade opened. This pedestrian and cycle bridge was built to improve access to events at the Sydney Cricket Ground and Sydney Football Stadium.

Naming
Anzac Parade began life as a series of discrete roadways through south-eastern Sydney, which were unified under one name in 1917. These streets were:

 Randwick Road, between Moore Park and Alison roads, Moore Park
 Eastern Avenue, between Alison Road and Lorne Avenue, Kensington
 Bunnerong Road, between Lorne Avenue and Kingsford Nine Ways
 Broad Road, between Nine Ways and the present-day Anzac Parade–Bunnerong Road intersection at Little Bay
 Bunnerong Road, between Little Bay and La Perouse.

Quambi Avenue, which ran between La Perouse tram terminus and the nearby wharf, was added to Anzac Parade in November 1934.

Public transport

The road is served by Transdev John Holland bus services, to the city, Railway Square, Bondi Junction, Maroubra, Westfield Eastgardens, Coogee, Little Bay and La Perouse The road also contains a bus-only lane prior to its intersection with Alison Road, as well as a separate parallel bus corridor accompanying its route through Moore Park. It is one of the busiest road based public transport routes in Sydney. This is due to the lack of rail infrastructure in the area and the Sydney Football Stadium, Sydney Cricket Ground, Randwick Racecourse and the University of New South Wales, Long Bay Gaol and NIDA all being located on this road.

in 2015, construction of the CBD and South East Light Rail commenced. Running from Circular Quay down George Street to Central station, it then crosses Moore Park and gles down Anzac Parade. South of Moore Park the line spits into two branches – one continuing down Anzac Parade to Kingsford which opened in 2020, and the second heading to Randwick via Alison Road which opened in 2019.  In April 2016, work began on a temporary six-lane diversion of Anzac Parade between the Albert Cotter Bridge and Lang Road while a tunnel was built below the road. Traffic was directed on to the temporary road from mid-2016. The original alignment was reinstated in April 2017.

South of Kingsford, Anzac Parade is a divided road with a wide grassy median strip. This median strip was formerly used by a tram service. The line was closed in 1961, when the route was replaced by buses.

See also

References

External links

RTA Webcam

Streets in Sydney
ANZAC (Australia)

Kensington, New South Wales
La Perouse, New South Wales

Little Bay, New South Wales
Malabar, New South Wales
Maroubra, New South Wales
Moore Park, New South Wales